Martín Ignacio Martínez de Mallea, known as Martín Ignacio de Loyola (c. 1550 in Eibar, Guipuzcoa, Spain – 1606 in Buenos Aires), was a Franciscan friar, best known for his two travels around the world in 1580–1584 and 1585–1589, being the first person to complete the world circumnavigation twice in different directions, and for his missionary effort in China.

He was a grandnephew of Ignatius of Loyola, and was ordained a priest in Alaejos in 1572.

Circumnavigations of the world
In both of his travels Loyola took advantage of Spain and Portugal being united under the crown of Philip II of Spain.

First circumnavigation: 1582–1584
Loyola's first circumnavigation was made in a westerly direction.

Departing Cadiz on 21 June 1582, he sailed for the Canary Islands, then crossed the Atlantic to La Désirade, Puerto Rico, and Santo Domingo, to arrive in San Juan de Lúa (modern Veracruz), in México. After crossing to the Pacific Ocean coast of Mexico at Acapulco he sailed once again in a westerly direction, visiting the Mariana Islands, and the Philippines, before eventually reaching the Empire of China, where he landed in Fujian province. There he and his companions were considered to be spies and were sent to Guangzhou. After a year they were set free and sent to Macau. After travelling on to Japan, he departed once again in a westerly direction to return to Europe at Lisbon via the Straits of Malacca, Portuguese India, the Cape of Good Hope and Saint Helena.

Loyola's account of his first journey around the world was first published in Rome in 1585, included in Juan González de Mendoza's Historia de las cosas más notables, ritos y costumbres del gran reyno dela China.

Second circumnavigation: 1585–1589
Loyola's second circumnavigation was made in an easterly direction.

It is not clear how or when Loyola made his eastward journey to China; in 1587, from Macau, China, Loyola continued eastward across the Pacific Ocean to Acapulco, Mexico, in a ship commanded by Pedro de Unamuno. From there he crossed Mexico to Veracruz, from where he finally set sail across the Atlantic to Spain.

Other journeys
In 1595, six years after his second return to Spain, he went to Paraguay, that he reached via Panama, Peru, and Chile – whose Spanish governor by then, Martín García de Loyola, was his cousin – and Río de la Plata.

He went back to Spain again in 1600 and returned to Paraguay in 1603, this time as Bishop of Asunción. He had been consecrated as such in Valladolid by Juan Bautista Acevedo Muñoz, Bishop of Valladolid, the year before.

See also
Jesuit China missions
First Synod of Asunción
List of circumnavigations
Circumnavigation
Pedro Cubero
Pedro Ordóñez de Ceballos

Notes

References
  J. Ignacio Tellechea Idígoras (ed.), Martín Ignacio de Loyola. Viaje alrdedor del mundo, Madrid, 1989. 
  
 Martin Ignacio de Loyola,

External links and additional sources
 (for Chronology of Bishops) 
 (for Chronology of Bishops) 
 Santos, Hector. "The characters on the galleon Esperanza" in Sulat sa Tansô. US, April 3, 1997.

Year of birth uncertain
1550 births
1606 deaths
Basque explorers
16th-century Spanish Roman Catholic priests
17th-century Roman Catholic bishops in Paraguay
Spanish Roman Catholic missionaries
Spanish Franciscans
Circumnavigators of the globe
16th-century travel writers
Spanish travel writers
People from Eibar
Year of birth unknown
Roman Catholic missionaries in China
Franciscan missionaries
Basque Roman Catholic priests
Roman Catholic bishops of Paraguay